Michael Qudus Bakare Omosanya (born 15 December 1999) is a Luxembourgian footballer who plays as a forward for German club Eintracht Trier  and the Luxembourg national team.

Career
Omosanya began playing football with the youth academy of Red Star Merl-Belair at the age of 6, and moved to F91 Dudelange's academy at the age of 12. He began his senior career on loan with Remich-Bous, before transferring to Mondercange in 2019. He made his way to the senior team of Fola Esch in the summer of 2021.

International career
Born in Luxembourg, Omosanya is of Nigerian descent. He debuted with the Luxembourg national team on 9 October 2021 in a 1–0 2022 FIFA World Cup qualification loss to Serbia.

References

External links
 
 
 FuPa Profile

1999 births
Living people
Sportspeople from Luxembourg City
Luxembourgian footballers
Luxembourg international footballers
Luxembourgian people of Nigerian descent
Association football forwards
CS Fola Esch players
FC Mondercange players
F91 Dudelange players
SV Eintracht Trier 05 players
Luxembourg National Division players
Regionalliga players
Luxembourgian expatriate footballers
Expatriate footballers in Germany
Luxembourgian expatriate sportspeople in Germany